Murat Pasha Mosque or Murad Pasha Mosque is the name of some Ottoman mosques. It may refer to:

 Murat Pasha Mosque, Antalya, (built 1570) in Antalya, Turkey
 Murad Pasha Mosque, Damascus, (built 1568) in Damascus, Syria
 Murat Pasha Mosque, Aksaray, Istanbul

tr:Murat Paşa Camii